Ignacio "Nacho" Rodríguez Marín (born 2 September 1970) is a former Spanish professional basketball player.

Professional career
Born in Málaga, Rodríguez played most of his career with the teams Spanish professional Liga ACB teams Unicaja Málaga and FC Barcelona Bàsquet. During his time with FC Barcelona, he won the EuroLeague's 2002-03 season championship.

In the Liga ACB (the top-tier level Spanish League), he played 16,605 minutes (5th most) in 737 games (2nd most).

Spain national team
Rodríguez also competed with the senior Spain national basketball team at the 2000 Summer Olympics, where the squad finished in 9th place.

References

1970 births
Living people
Spanish men's basketball players
Olympic basketball players of Spain
Basketball players at the 2000 Summer Olympics
Liga ACB players
Baloncesto Málaga players
FC Barcelona Bàsquet players
Menorca Bàsquet players
CB Valladolid players
Point guards
Sportspeople from Málaga
2002 FIBA World Championship players
1998 FIBA World Championship players
20th-century Spanish people
21st-century Spanish people